Yohannes Mohamed (born 21 January 1948) is an Ethiopian former long-distance runner who competed in the 1972 Summer Olympics and in the 1980 Summer Olympics.

References

1948 births
Living people
Ethiopian male long-distance runners
Olympic athletes of Ethiopia
Athletes (track and field) at the 1972 Summer Olympics
Athletes (track and field) at the 1980 Summer Olympics
Ethiopian male steeplechase runners
African Games gold medalists for Ethiopia
African Games medalists in athletics (track and field)
Athletes (track and field) at the 1973 All-Africa Games
Athletes (track and field) at the 1978 All-Africa Games
20th-century Ethiopian people
21st-century Ethiopian people